This is a list of beaches in Guam, clockwise starting from the northernmost tip of the island, with the name of the village it is in.

 Ritidian Point (Dededo), in the Guam National Wildlife Refuge
 Jinapsan Beach (Yigo), restricted access on Andersen Air Force Base

 Tarague Beach (Yigo), restricted access on Andersen Air Force Base
 Scout Beach (Yigo), restricted access on Andersen Air Force Base
 University of Guam Marine Lab Beach (Mangilao)
 Taga'chang Beach (Yona)
 Togcha Bay (Talofofo), the location of the restaurant Jeff's Pirate Cove
 Ipan Beach Park (Talofofo)
 Jones Beach (Talofofo)
 Calvo's Beach (Talofofo)

 First Beach (Talofofo)
 Talofofo Beach (Talofofo), at Talofofo Bay
 Inarajan Pools (Inarajan), also called Salaglula Pools
 Atao Beach (Inarajan)
 Cocos Island (Merizo), the largest island off the coast of Guam and the southernmost beach on this list
 Piga Beach (Merizo)
 Bile Bay (Merizo)
 Ajmo Beach (Merizo)
 Nimitz Beach Park (Agat)

 Agat Beach (Agat), NHRP-listed Agat Invasion Beach of the 1944 Battle of Guam, part of War in the Pacific National Historical Park
 Rizal Beach (Agat)
 Dadi Beach (Santa Rita), restricted access on Naval Base Guam
 Gab Gab Beach (Santa Rita), restricted access on Naval Base Guam
 San Luis Beach (Santa Rita), restricted access on Naval Base Guam
 Fantasy Island (Piti), restricted access on Naval Base Guam
 Family Beach (Piti)
 Pedro Santos Memorial Park (Piti)
 Tepungan Beach (Piti), also known as FishEye Marine Park
 Asan Beach Park (Asan-Maina), NHRP-listed Asan Invasion Beach of the 1944 Battle of Guam, part of War in the Pacific National Historical Park
 Asan Beach (Asan-Maina)
 West Hagåtña Beach Front / Agana Bay Beach (Hagåtña)
 Dungca's Beach / Trinchera Beach (Hagåtña)

 "Tumon Beach" is an umbrella term for the shoreline of Tumon Bay, Guam's tourist center, which is divided into variously named beaches and parks
 Ypao Beach (Tumon)
 Matapang Beach (Tumon)
 Gun Beach (Tumon)
 Faifai Beach (Tumon), includes the NHRP-listed Fafai Beach Site
 Tanguisson Beach (Dededo)
 Shark's Hole Beach (Dededo)
 Haputo Beach (Dededo), restricted access on Naval Computer and Telecommunications Station Guam, includes the NHRP-listed Haputo Beach Site
 Double Reef Beach (Dededo)

 Falcona Beach (Dededo)
 Uruno Beach (Dededo)

See also
 List of beaches in the United States

References

 
+Guam
Tourist attractions in Guam